Austria competed at the 1968 Summer Olympics in Mexico City, Mexico. 43 competitors, 38 men and 8 women, took part in 37 events in 12 sports.

Medalists

Athletics

Boxing

Canoeing

Diving

Fencing

Five fencers, all men, represented Austria in 1968.

Men's foil
 Roland Losert
 Udo Birnbaum
 Rudolf Trost

Men's épée
 Herbert Polzhuber
 Rudolf Trost
 Roland Losert

Men's team épée
 Udo Birnbaum, Roland Losert, Herbert Polzhuber, Frank Battig

Modern pentathlon

Three male pentathletes represented Austria in 1968.

Individual
 Wolf-Dietrich Sonnleitner
 Siegfried Springer
 Wolfgang Leu

Team
 Wolf-Dietrich Sonnleitner
 Siegfried Springer
 Wolfgang Leu

Rowing

Sailing

Open

Shooting

Five shooters, all men, represented Austria in 1968.
Open

Swimming

Weightlifting

Wrestling

References

External links
Official Olympic Reports
International Olympic Committee results database

Nations at the 1968 Summer Olympics
1968
Summer Olympics